Rodrigo Isgro (born 24 March 1999) is an Argentine rugby union player.

Career
He played for Argentina in junior rugby and played 15 a side rugby union for Mendoza Rugby Club, and also appeared at the 2019 U20 World Championships. He was named in the Argentina squad for the Rugby sevens at the 2020 Summer Olympics.

References 

1999 births
Living people
Argentine rugby union players
Argentine rugby sevens players
Olympic rugby sevens players of Argentina
Rugby sevens players at the 2020 Summer Olympics
Olympic medalists in rugby sevens
Medalists at the 2020 Summer Olympics
Olympic bronze medalists for Argentina
Sportspeople from Mendoza, Argentina